Munk may refer to:
Munk, family name
 Munk, taxonomic author abbreviation of mycologist Anders Munk (1922–1989)
 Munk, Kentucky, unincorporated community
 Chipmunk
 Jens Munk Island
 Munk School of Global Affairs

See also
 Munch (disambiguation)
 Monk (disambiguation)
 Munak (disambiguation), places in Iran